Arshad Warsi started his career as an assistant director to Mahesh Bhatt in Kaash (1987). Warsi choreographed the title song of Roop Ki Rani Choron Ka Raja (1993), before making his acting debut in the Amitabh Bachchan-produced Tere Mere Sapne (1996). It was followed by Betaabi (1997), Hero Hindustani (1998), Hogi Pyaar Ki Jeet and Trishakti (both 1999), among others, but most of these films failed to do well at the box office. In 2003, he had his breakthrough by playing the comic sidekick Circuit in Rajkumar Hirani's comedy-drama Munna Bhai M.B.B.S. His performance garnered him the Zee Cine Award for Best Actor in a Comic Role and received nominations for the Filmfare, IIFA, Screen and Apsara Film Producers Guild Award for Best Supporting Actor. Warsi won the GIFA Best Comedian Award for his role in the comedy Hulchul (2004), and garnered critical acclaim for portraying a police officer in the crime drama Sehar (2005). He received his second Filmfare Award for Best Supporting Actor nomination for his role in the romantic comedy Salaam Namaste (2005).

In 2006, Warsi starred in the Rohit Shetty-directed comedy Golmaal: Fun Unlimited, and reprised his role of Circuit in the sequel Lage Raho Munna Bhai. His performance in the latter won him the Filmfare Award for Best Performance in a Comic Role, among other awards. That same year, he played lead roles in the mystery Anthony Kaun Hai? and the counter-terrorism drama Kabul Express. Warsi also hosted the first season of the reality television show Bigg Boss for which he earned the Indian Television Academy Award for Best Anchor – Game/Quiz Show. In 2007, he played a footballer in the sports film Dhan Dhana Dhan Goal. The following year, he reteamed with Shetty for Golmaal Returns (2008), and played an intermittent explosive disorder patient in the comedy Krazzy 4 (2008). He won the Screen Award for Best Supporting Actor and received several nominations for playing a con man in the black comedy Ishqiya (2010). Also in 2010, Warsi co-produced and starred in the supernatural comedy-drama Hum Tum Aur Ghost, which performed poorly at the box office. Golmaal 3, the year's second-highest grossing Hindi film also featured him in a primary role. His first negative role came in 2013 with the action thriller Zila Ghaziabad, a critical and commercial failure. Warsi's portrayal of a lawyer in the comedy-drama Jolly LLB (2013), directed by Subhash Kapoor, garnered him several awards, including the IIFA Award for Best Performance in a Comic Role. His portrayal of a thief in Dedh Ishqiya (2014) attracted critical praise.

Feature films

Television

Awards and nominations

See also
 List of accolades received by Lage Raho Munna Bhai

Notes

References

Further reading

External links
 

Indian filmographies
Male actor filmographies
Lists of awards received by Indian actor